Saltoro River is a tributary river of Shyok River in the Siachen Region. Its main source is Bilafond Glacier. Before falling into Shyok river, the water of Saltoro river first drains into Hushe river at Haldi village which finally falls in Shyok.

References 

Rivers of Gilgit-Baltistan
Tributaries of the Indus River
Karakoram
Rivers of Pakistan